Quincy City Hall is the seat of government for the City of Quincy, Massachusetts. The historic town hall building at 1305 Hancock Street in Quincy Center was built in 1844.  It is a somewhat monumental example of Greek Revival architecture, featuring a temple front with two-story Ionic pilasters and a triangular pediment.  Elements of the main facade were significantly altered when the town was converted to a city in 1888.  It has been the seat of local government since its construction.

The building was listed on the National Register of Historic Places in 1980 (as "Quincy Town Hall").

See also
National Register of Historic Places listings in Quincy, Massachusetts

References

External links

Official City of Quincy website

City and town halls on the National Register of Historic Places in Massachusetts
Government buildings completed in 1844
Greek Revival architecture in Massachusetts
Buildings and structures in Quincy, Massachusetts
National Register of Historic Places in Quincy, Massachusetts